The Caudron C.51 was a French biplane floatplane made by Caudron in the early 1920s.

One C.51 was built, powered by a  Clerget engine and bearing the registration F-AIBL.

It competed in the Monaco meeting in April 1921, piloted by Poirée.

References

External links

1920s French military trainer aircraft
C.051
Biplanes
Single-engined tractor aircraft